Victoria Azarenka was the defending champion, but lost to qualifier Marina Erakovic in the second round.

Serena Williams, ranked world no. 169 at the time, won the title by defeating Marion Bartoli 7–5, 6–1 in the final. This win was Williams' first WTA title since her win in Wimbledon on July 3, 2010, it was on her third tournament of the year following injuries and health problems sustained with the 2010 season.

Seeds
The top four seeds received a bye into the second round.

Qualifying

Draw

Finals

Top half

Bottom half

External links
 WTA tournament draws

Silicon Valley Classic
2011 WTA Tour